This is a list of the highest-grossing Czech films, with box office from Czech cinemas given in Czech korunas.

Highest-grossing Czech films

Highest-grossing films by year

See also
 List of highest-grossing films
 List of most expensive films
 List of most expensive Czech films

Notes

References

Highest-grossing
Czech